Cat Hill is a settlement on Ascension Island, an island which forms part of the British Overseas Territories.

History
The Target Tracking Radar Station, known as the Golf Ball, was built on this site, designated for use as a base for the United States Armed Forces, between 1960 and 1961. The site subsequently became the location of the joint NSA-GCHQ Composite Signals Organisation facility on the island.

See also
List of towns in Saint Helena, Ascension and Tristan da Cunha

References

External links

Populated places in Saint Helena, Ascension and Tristan da Cunha
Geography of Ascension Island